The Bum Trilogy consists of three books by Australian author Andy Griffiths. They are aimed at children aged around ten and contain much toilet humor.

Name change
In the United States, the word "bum" has another meaning (i.e. homeless vagrant), so it is changed to "butt" in the versions sold there. The third book is further renamed to Butt Wars: The Final Conflict.

Griffiths' reference guide to "prehistoric bumosaurs", What Bumosaur Is That?, was published in May 2007. It is not a part of the trilogy, although the book was mentioned in the trilogy.

Books
The Day My Bum Went Psycho
Zombie Bums from Uranus
Bumageddon: The Final Pongflict (also known as Butt Wars! The Final Conflict)

External links
 The Bum Trilogy's website  
 Pan Macmillan's Bumageddon game

Novel series